Goaltore, also spelled Goaltor, is a village in the Garhbeta II CD block in the Medinipur Sadar subdivision of the Paschim Medinipur district in West Bengal, India.

Geography

Location

Area overview
There are large forested areas in the subdivision. The soil is predominantly lateritic. Around 30% of the population of the district resides in this subdivision. 13.95% of the population of this subdivision lives in urban areas and 86.05% of the population lives in  rural areas.

Note: The map alongside presents some of the notable locations in the subdivision. All places marked in the map are linked in the larger full screen map.

Demographics
According to the 2011 Census of India, Goaltore had a total population of 693, of which 356 (51%) were males and 337 (49%) were females. There were 48 persons in the age range of 0–6 years. The total number of literate persons in Goaltore was 606 (93.95% of the population over 6 years).

.*For language details see Garhbeta II#Language and religion

Civic administration

CD block HQ
The headquarters of Garhbeta II block are located at Goaltore.

Police station
Goaltore police station has jurisdiction over parts of Garhbeta I, Garhbeta II, and Garhbeta III CD blocks.

Economy
The West Bengal Government has offered 1,000 acres of  land in Goaltore for industry.

Transport
State Highway 4 (West Bengal) running from Jhalda (in Purulia district) to Digha (in Purba Medinipur district) passes through Goaltore.

Education
The Santal Bidroha Sardha Satabarsiki Mahavidyalaya is a coeducational college at Goaltore, established in 2005. It offers honors courses in Bengali, Santali, Sanskrit, English, geography, history, political science, philosophy, mathematics, chemistry, nutrition and zoology.

Healthcare
Kewakole Rural Hospital, with 30 beds, is located in Goaltore and is the major government medical facility in the Garhbeta II CD block.

References

Villages in Paschim Medinipur district